André Chéradame (1871–1948) was a French journalist and scholar from the École Libre des Sciences Politiques. He also worked for the French newspaper Le Petit Journal.

He became known for his books about the geopolitics of Europe during the first half of the 20th century, mainly the aspects of German militarism and its expansionist policies. He predicted, even before the two world wars, that the German General Staff would have a main role in planning military aggressions with the aim of creating a Greater Germany that would first engulf Central-Eastern Europe, then all of Europe and by 1950, the rest of the world.

He predicted that only by dismantling the militarist German elites and institutions Germany itself would be at peace with the rest of Europe, which the Allies in fact did after World War II, dissolving both Prussia and the German General Staff.

References

Nicolas Ginsburger, "André Chéradame et l'émergence d'une cartographie géopolitique de guerre en 1916", Cartes & Géomatique, n°223, mars 2015, p. 79-90.

External links
 

1871 births
1948 deaths
French male non-fiction writers